Norman Kelley is a freelance journalist, author, and former segment producer at WBAI 99.5 FM.

Kelley has written for numerous publications, including LA Weekly, The Village Voice, Newsday, and Brooklyn Rail. Kelley is also working on 90-minute documentary entitled The Head Negro in Charge Syndrome which will discuss what he describes as the "dead end" in African-American political thought.

Books
 The Head Negro in Charge Syndrome: The Dead End of Black Politics (Nation Books, 2004),
 Black Heat (Amistad)
 
 
 Brooklyn Noir (Akashic Books) (contributor)
 Gig: Americans Talk About Their Jobs at the Turn of the Millennium (Random House 2000) (contributor)
 R&B (Rhythm and Business): The Political Economy of Black Music (Akashic Books) (editor)

References

External links
Journalist's website
Journalist's blog

Year of birth missing (living people)
Living people
American male journalists
African-American writers
21st-century African-American people